The 1996 Singer Champions Trophy was held in Sharjah, UAE, between November 7-15, 1996. Three national teams took part: New Zealand, Pakistan, and Sri Lanka.

The 1996 Champions Trophy started with a double round-robin tournament where each team played the other twice. The two leading teams qualified for the final. Pakistan won the tournament and US$30,000. Runners-up New Zealand won US$15,000.

The beneficiaries of the tournament were Talat Ali,  Sadiq Mohammad and Ijaz Ahmed (all Pakistan) who each received US$35,000.

Matches

Group stage

Final
New Zealand qualified for the final because they had taken more points than Sri Lanka in their head-to-head games.

See also
 Sharjah Cup

References

 Cricket Archive: Singer Champions Trophy 1996/97
 ESPNCricinfo: Singer Champions Trophy, 1996/97
 

International cricket competitions from 1994–95 to 1997
Singer Champions Trophy, 1996
1996 in Emirati sport
International cricket competitions in the United Arab Emirates